Mufti Sardar Ali Haqqani (1970 – 2022) also known as "Tawajju Ustaad" was a Pakistani Islamic scholar from Nowshera district. He was known on social media for his bold speeches in Pashto. He died in a traffic accident on 7 May 2022.

Biography 
He was born in 1970 in Maini, Swabi District. He received his early education in Charsadda from Darul Uloom Jamia Muhammadiyah Matta Mughalkhel, a madrassa established by Haq Nawaz Haqqani Shaheed. Then he studied Hadith and specialization from Darul Uloom Haqqania.

He was also the Amir of Nowshera District of International Khatme Nabuwat Movement.

Haqqani was nominated in 2018 by Pakistan Rah-e-Haq Party and Ahl-e-Sunnat Wal Jamaat Nowshera as joint candidate on PK-63 and issued party ticket. However, he managed to get only 1113 votes in this election and PTI candidate Mian Jamshed Uddin Kakakhel won this constituency with 24760 votes.

He was arrested on 28 April 2021, for making provocative speeches against doctors and nurses. In a speech on 10 June 2021, he was arrested for inciting the public to carry out a suicide attack on Nobel laureate Malala Yousafzai.

On 3 February 2022, during a meeting in Swabi, a man named Musa carried out a failed assassination attempt in which he was injured. However, the assailant was arrested along with the device.

Haqqani died in a traffic accident on 7 May 2022. The accident took place on Kohat Road near Zor Kali area of Dara Adamkhel. Mufti Sardar Ali's bodyguard and a driver were injured in the accident.

References

1970 births
2022 deaths
Darul Uloom Haqqania alumni
Deobandis
People from Swabi District
Pakistani Sunni Muslims
Pakistani Islamic religious leaders
People from Nowshera District